Loher Cashel is a stone ringfort (cashel) and National Monument located on the Iveragh Peninsula, Ireland.

Location

This location may have been chosen for its view of Skellig Michael.

History
The cashel was built around the 9th century AD as a defended farmstead. It was recently reconstructed.

Description

It is built of drystone with gaps filled in with rubble.

In the interior are a large round house and a smaller rectangular house; archaeology has shown that these were preceded by wooden buildings. A souterrain was located in the circular house.

The entrance has a stone-lined passage similar to that at Staigue stone fort.

References

National Monuments in County Kerry
Archaeological sites in County Kerry